The Gadar Tamburawa River is a river in Nigeria, just south of Kano. 
Gada means bridge in Hausa language.

References

                                                                   

Kano State
Rivers of Nigeria